David Keith (December 27, 1973 – October 22, 2020) was an American professional stock car racing driver and spotter.

Racing career
Keith started racing go-karts at age nine and went on to win multiple championships. He went on to race in the NASCAR Winston Cup Series and the NASCAR Busch Series.

Death
Keith died on October 22, 2020, at the age of 46.

Motorsports career results

NASCAR
(key) (Bold – Pole position awarded by qualifying time. Italics – Pole position earned by points standings or practice time. * – Most laps led.)

Winston Cup Series

Busch Series

ARCA Re/Max Series
(key) (Bold – Pole position awarded by qualifying time. Italics – Pole position earned by points standings or practice time. * – Most laps led.)

References

External links
 

1973 births
2020 deaths
NASCAR drivers
ARCA Menards Series drivers
Sportspeople from Owensboro, Kentucky
Racing drivers from Kentucky
Racing drivers from Owensboro, Kentucky